The 1620s decade ran from January 1, 1620, to December 31, 1629.

Significant people
 Antonio Maria Abbatini of Rome (c.1595–1680), composer
 George Abbot of England (1562–1633), Archbishop of Canterbury, held position 1611–1633
 Diego Sarmiento de Acuña, conde de Gondomar of Spain (1567–1626), Spanish ambassador to England-Wales
 Thomas Adams of England (1566–1620), publisher
 Niccolò Alamanni of Rome (1583–1626), Catholic priest, antiquarian, and custodian of the Vatican Library
 Albert VII (1559–1621), Archduke of Austria and governor (1596–1598) and Co-sovereign of the Spanish Netherlands (modern-day Belgium and Luxembourg) with Infanta Isabella Clara Eugenia of Spain, held position (as Co-sovereign) 1598–1621
 William Alexander, 1st Earl of Stirling of Scotland (1570–1640), Scottish colonial organizer of Nova Scotia and Secretary for Scotland
 Alexander of Imereti (1609–1660), Imeretian Prince and future King of Imereti
 Manuel de Almeida of Portugal (1580–1646), Jesuit Missionary and ambassador to the Emperor of Ethiopia
 Emilio Bonaventura Altieri of Rome (1590–1676), Catholic bishop and future Pope
 Giambattista Andreini of Tuscany (1576–1654), actor and playwright
 Giovanni Andrea Ansaldo of Genoa (1584–1638), painter
 Sir Samuel Argall (1580–1626), former deputy governor of Virginia and current naval officer in the English navy
 Abdul Hasan Asaf-Khan of Persia (?-1641), Grand Vizer of the Mughal Empire (and brother of Nur Jahan), in office c.1611–1632
 Sir Thomas Aylesbury, 1st Baronet of England (1576–1657), Baronet and Surveyor of the English Royal Navy
 Francis Bacon of England (1561–1626), philosopher, jurist, scientist, writer, and politician; specifically Member of Parliament, Attorney General for England and Wales (1613–1617), and Lord Chancellor (1617–1621)
 Nathaniel Bacon of England (1585–1627), painter (not to be confused with the leader of the same name of Bacon's Rebellion)
 William Baffin of England (?–1622), navigator and explorer
 Francesco Barberini, seniore of Florence (1597–1679), Cardinal and diplomat
 Jakob Bartsch of Lusatia (1600–1633), astronomer
 François de Bassompierre of France (1579–1646), courtier and Marshal of France
 Robert Bellarmine (1542–1621), Italian Jesuit and Cardinal
 Bernard of Saxe-Weimar (1604–1639), nobleman and general
 Pierre de Bérulle of France (1575–1629), Cardinal and diplomat
 Maximilien de Béthune, duc de Sully of France (1560–1641), Favourite and minister under Henry IV and Louis XIII
 Andries Bicker of the Netherlands (1586–1652), administrator of the Dutch East India Company, Mayor of Amsterdam, and diplomat
 Willem Blaeu of the Netherlands (1571–1638), cartographer and publisher
 Abraham Bloemaert of the Netherlands (1566–1651), painter and printmaker
 Jakob Böhme of Görlitz (1575–1624), Christian mystic
 Juan Pablo Bonet of Spain (c.1573-1633), Catholic priest and inventor of the sign language alphabet
 François de Bonne, duc de Lesdiguières of France (1543–1626), Constable of France
 Sidonia von Borcke of Pomerania (1548–1620), noblewoman and Witch-hunt victim (as well as a figure of later legends)
 Federico Borromeo of Milan (1564–1631), Cardinal and Archbishop of Milan
 Richard Boyle, 1st Earl of Cork (1566–1643), Anglo-Irish politician
 William Bradford (1590–1657), Prominent Leader and Governor of the Plymouth colony, in office 1621–1633, 1635–1636, 1637–1638, 1639–1644, 1645–1657
 Jean de Brébeuf of France (1593–1649), Jesuit missionary
 William Brewster (c.1566-1644), Puritan preacher and Plymouth leader
 Henry Briggs of England (1561–1630), mathematician
 Étienne Brûlé of France (1592?–1633), explorer
 John Bull of England (1562?-1628), composer and musician
 Karel Bonaventura Buquoy of France (1571–1621), general in the service of the Holy Roman Empire
 Robert Burton of England (1577–1640), scholar
 Estêvão Cacella of Portugal (1585–1630), Jesuit missionary
 Pedro Calderón de la Barca of Spain (1600–1681), playwright and poet
 George Calvert, 1st Baron Baltimore of England (1579–1632), nobleman, Member of Parliament, Secretary of State, and English colonizer of the North America (most notably the founder of the Province of Avalon in Newfoundland and future founder of Maryland)
 William Camden of England (1551–1623), historian and topographer
 Tommaso Campanella (1568–1639), Italian philosopher, theologian, astrologer, and poet
 John Carver (1576?-1621), Leader and First Governor of the Plymouth Colony, in office 1620–1621
 Henry Cary, 1st Viscount Falkland of England (1575–1633), military officer, colonizer, and Lord Lieutenant of Ireland
 Ernst Casimir of the Netherlands (1573–1632), nobleman and military commander
 Aodh Mac Cathmhaoil of Ireland (1571–1626), Catholic theologian and Archbishop of Armagh
 Samuel de Champlain (1570?–1635), French explorer, administrator of New France, and founder of Quebec City
 Charles I of Gonzaga-Nevers (1580–1637), Duke of Nevers and Mantua (claim for the later supported by France)
 Charles Emmanuel I of Savoy (1562–1630), Duke of Savoy and Papal backed candidate to the throne of the Duchy of Mantua
 Ivan Cherkassky of Russia (1580?-1642), boyar and head of the Treasury, Streletsky Prikaz and Aptekarsky Prikaz, in office 1621–1622 (as Treasurer), 1622–23 (as head of the Streletsky Prikaz and Aptekarsky Prikaz)
 Jan Karol Chodkiewicz of Poland (1560–1621), military commander
 Christian the Younger of Brunswick (1599–1626), Duke of Brunswick-Lüneburg and Protestant Commander
 Antonio Cifra of Rome (1584–1629), composer
 Jan Pieterszoon Coen of the Netherlands (1587–1629), Governor-General of the Dutch East Indies
 Sir Edward Coke of England (1552–1634), Jurist and Member of Parliament
 Sir John Coke of England (1563–1644), Member of Parliament and Secretary of State
 Nicolò Contarini of Venice (1553–1631), politician and future Doge of Venice
 Diego Fernández de Córdoba, Marquis of Guadalcázar of Spain (1578–1630), nobleman and Viceroy of New Spain and Peru, in office 1612–1621 (New Spain), 1622–1629 (Peru)
 Gregorio Nuñez Coronel of Portugal (1548–1620), Augustinian theologian, writer, and preacher
 Adam de Coster of Flanders (1586–1643), painter
 Nathaniel Courthope of England (1585–1620), merchant navy officer
 Thomas Coventry, 1st Baron Coventry of England (1578–1640), Judge, Member of Parliament, and politician (specifically Soliticar General (1617–1621), Attorney General (1621–1625), and Lord Chancellor (1625–1640))
 Oliver Cromwell of England (1599–1658), Member of Parliament, general, and future ruler of England-Wales, Scotland, and Ireland
 Sir Sackville Crowe, 1st Baronet of England (1595–1671), baronet, Treasurer of the Navy, Member of Parliament, and future ambassador
 Alfonso de la Cueva, marqués de Bedmar of Spain (1572–1655), diplomat and Catholic theologian
 Robert Cushman of England (1578–1625), Plymouth colony organizer
 Cyril I (1572–1638), Ecumenical Patriarch of Constantinople, held position in 1612, 1620–1623, 1623–1633, 1633–1634, 1634–1635, 1637–1638
 Daišan of Manchuria (1583–1648), Manchurian prince (brother of Huang Taiji) and military commander
 Mir Damad of Persia (?–1631), philosopher
 John Danvers of England (1588–1655), courtier and politician
 Date Masamune of Japan (1567–1636), Daimyō of Sendai
 John Davies of England (1569–1626), lawyer, poet, and politician (specifically Attorney General of Ireland, Member of Parliament, and Judge)
 John Davies (AKA Mallwyd) of Wales (1567–1644), scholar, translator, and Anglican priest
 Dawar of India (?–1628), Mughal Prince
 Thomas Dekker of England (1572–1632), playwright and poet
 Joseph Solomon Delmedigo (1591–1655), Italian rabbi, author, physician, mathematician, and music theorist
 Thomas Dempster of Scotland (1579–1625), scholar and historian
 Robert Devereux, 3rd Earl of Essex of England (1591–1646), nobleman and military commander
 Kenelm Digby of England (1603–1665), courtier, diplomat, privateer, and philosopher
 John Donne of England (1571?–1631), Anglican priest, poet, and philosopher
 Michael Drayton of England (1563–1631), poet
 Cornelius Drebbel of the Netherlands (1572–1633), inventor
 Jeremias Drexel of Bavaria (1581–1638), Catholic theologian and Court Preacher at the court of Prince-Elector Maximilian I
 Robert Dudley of England (1574–1649), explorer and geographer
 Pierre Dupuy of France (1582–1651), scholar
 Mar Elia Shimun X, Patriarch of the Chaldean Catholic Church (Patriarchate then based in Salamas, in modern-day Iran. However a later Patriarch, Mar Shimun XIII Dinkha, broke the union with the Catholic Church, thus he and other Patriarchs of the Shimun line are sometimes list as Patriarchs of the Assyrian Church of the East), held position 1600–1653
 Sir John Eliot of England (1592–1632), Vice-Admiral of Devon and Member of Parliament
 Mar Eliyya IX, Patriarch of the Assyrian Church of the East (Patriarchate then based in Alqosh, in modern-day Iraq), held position in 1617–1660
 John Endecott (1588?–1665), founder and first governor of the Massachusetts Bay Colony
 Alonso Fajardo de Entenza of Spain (?-1624), governor-general of the Philippines, in office 1618–1624
 Francesco Erizzo of Venice (1566–1646), diplomat and future Doge of Venice
 Thomas van Erpe of the Netherlands (1584–1624), Orientalist Scholar
 Fakhr-al-Din II (1572–1635), Lebanese prince and governor of the Ottoman province of Syria, in office (as governor) 1624–1632
 Francis Fane, 1st Earl of Westmorland of England (1580–1629), nobleman and statesman
 John Felton of England (1595–1628), soldier and assassin of George Villiers, 1st Duke of Buckingham
 Nicholas Felton of England (1556–1626), academic and Anglican cleric
 Cardinal-Infante Ferdinand of Austria (1609–1641), nobleman, Spanish Prince (Infante), and Cardinal
 Ferdinand IV, Archduke of Austria (1608–1657), Habsburg Prince and future Holy Roman Emperor
 Domenico Fetti of Rome (1589–1623), painter
 Fidelis of Sigmaringen (1578–1622), Capuchin friar and Martyr
 William Fiennes, 1st Viscount Saye and Sele of England (1582–1662), nobleman and statesman
 Filaret (AKA Feodor Romanov) of Russia (1553–1633), Patriarch of Moscow and statesman, held position (as Patriarch) 1612–1629
 John Fletcher of England (1579–1625), playwright
 John Ford of England (1586-1640?), playwright and poet
 Frederick of Denmark (1609–1670), Danish Prince and future King of Denmark and Norway
 Frederick V of the Palatinate/I of Bohemia (1596–1632), Prince-Elector of the Palatinate and King of Bohemia (a sub-state of the Holy Roman Empire), r. 1610–1623 (as Prince-Elector of the Palatinate) and r. 1619–1620 (as King of Bohemia)
 Frederick Ulrich (1591–1634), Duke of Brunswick-Calenberg, held position 1613–1634
 Galileo Galilei of Tuscany (1564–1642), astronomer and physicist
 Gang Hong-rip of Korea, treasonous general who aided the Manchus
 Gaston, Duke of Orléans of France (1608–1660), French Prince (brother of Louis XIII) and commander of the aristocratic revolt at Les Ponts-de-Cé
 Artemisia Gentileschi of Rome (1593–1656), painter
 George William (1595–1640), Elector of Brandenburg and Duke of Prussia
 Johann Gerhard (1582–1637), German Lutheran theologian
 Hessel Gerritsz of the Netherlands (1581–1632), cartographer
 Orlando Gibbons of England (1583–1625), composer and organist
 Thomas Goffe of England (1591–1629), playwright
 Luis de Góngora of Spain (1561–1627), poet, playwright, and writer
 Roque González (1576–1628), Spanish-American Jesuit missionary and martyr
 Sir Ferdinando Gorges of England (1565–1647), colonial entrepreneur in North America and founder of Maine
 Ivan Tarasievich Gramotin of Russia (?–1638), diplomat and head of the Posolsky Prikaz, held position 1619–1626
 Orazio Grassi (1583–1654), Italian mathematician, astronomer, and architect
 Richard Grenville of England (1600–1658), Anglo-Cornish soldier, Member of Parliament, and future Baronet and Royalist Commander
 Fulke Greville, 1st Baron Brooke of England (1554–1628), nobleman, statesman, and writer
 Hugo Grotius of the Netherlands (1583–1645), philosopher and writer
 Jan Gruter of the Netherlands (1560–1627), scholar
 Mario Guiducci of Tuscany (1585–1646), lawyer and associate of Galileo Galilei during the dispute with Orazio Grassi
 Jean Guiton of France (1585–1654), Huguenot rebel and Admiral
 Edmund Gunter of England (1581–1626), mathematician
 John Guy (?-1629), former governor of Newfoundland and current Member of the Parliament of England
 Gaspar de Guzmán, Count-Duke of Olivares of Spain (1587–1645), nobleman and Chief Minister under Philip III and Philip IV, held position 1618–1643
 John Hampden of England (1595–1643), Member of Parliament and future Parliamentarian commander during the English Civil War
 Kryštof Harant of Bohemia (1564–1621), nobleman, traveller, humanist, soldier, writer and composer
 William Harvey of England (1578–1657), physician who discovered the systematic circulation of blood
 Hasekura Tsunenaga of Japan (1571–1622), diplomat
 Richard Hawkins of England (1562–1622), explorer and privateer
 George Hay, 1st Earl of Kinnoull of Scotland (1572–1634), nobleman, judge and Lord Chancellor of Scotland, held position (as chancellor) 1622–1634
 James Hay, 1st Earl of Carlisle of Scotland (c.1590–1636), nobleman and diplomat
 Piet Pieterszoon Hein of the Netherlands (1577–1629), Vice-Admiral of the Dutch West India Company
 Henrietta Maria of France (1609–1669), French princess and Queen Consort of England-Wales and Scotland
 Edward Herbert, 1st Baron Herbert of Cherbury of Wales (1583–1648), diplomat, poet, and philosopher
 George Herbert of Wales (1593–1633), poet, orator and Anglican priest
 Philip Herbert of England (1584–1649), nobleman (future Earl of Pembroke) and politician
 William Herbert, 3rd Earl of Pembroke of England (1580–1630), nobleman, Lord Lieutenant of Cornwall County and Chancellor of the University of Oxford, held position 1601-1630 (as Earl), 1604-1630 (as Lord Lietuent) and 1616-1630 (as Chancellor)
 Antonio de Herrera y Tordesillas of Spain (1559–1625), historian
 Thomas Heywood of England (1570?-1641), playwright, actor, and author
 Thomas Hobbes of England (1588–1679), philosopher
 Heinrich Holk (1599–1633) Danish-German mercenary and commander
 Henricus Hondius II of the Netherlands (1597–1651), cartographer and publisher
 Isaiah Horowitz (1565–1630), Rabbi and Jewish mystic
 Thomas Howard, 1st Earl of Berkshire of England (1587–1669), nobleman
 Constantijn Huygens of the Netherlands (1596–1687), poet, composer, and secretary under Stadtholders Frederick Henry and William II
 Im Gyeong Eop of Korea (1594–1646), general
 Sigismondo d'India (1582–1629), Italian composer
 Nicholas Iquan (AKA Zheng Zhilong) of China (1604–1661), pirate and Ming Dynasty admiral
 Menasseh Ben Israel of Portugal (1604–1657), rabbi, kabbalist, scholar, writer, diplomat, printer, and publisher
 William Jaggard of England (1568–1623), printer and publisher
 Jan Janszoon of the Netherlands (1570? – c.1641), Barbary Pirate
 Willem Janszoon of the Netherlands (1570–1630), explorer and colonial governor
 Juan Martínez de Jáuregui y Aguilar of Spain (1583–1641), poet, scholar, and painter
 Jörg Jenatsch of Switzerland (1596–1639), politician and military commander
 Jirgalang of Manchuria (1599–1655), nobleman, general, and statesman
 Johann Ernst I (1594–1626), Duke of Saxe-Weimar, r. 1605–1620
 Inigo Jones of England (1573–1652), architect
 Ben Jonson of England (1572–1637), playwright, poet, and Poet Laureate, held post in 1619–1637
 Johannes Junius of Bamberg (1573–1628), Mayor of Bamberg and Bamberg witch trial suspect and victim
 Madam Ke of China (?–1627), adviser to the Tianqi Emperor
 Johannes Kepler (1571–1630), German mathematician and astronomer
 Hendrick de Keyser of the Netherlands (1565–1621), sculptor and architect
 Thomas de Keyser of the Netherlands (1596–1667), painter and architect
 Khosro Mirza of Kartli (1565–1658), Georgian Prince, general in the Persian army, and future King of Kartli
 Robert Killigrew of England (1580–1633), Member of Parliament and English Ambassador to the Netherlands
 Athanasius Kircher (1601?–1680), German Catholic theologian and scholar
 David Kirke of England (1597–1654), adventurer and English colonizer of Canada
 Stanisław Koniecpolski of Poland (1594?-1646), nobleman and military commander
 Thomas Lake of England (1567–1630), Member of Parliament and former Secretary of State
 Giovanni Lanfranco of Parma (1582–1647), painter
 William Laud of England (1573–1645), Anglican theologian and future Archbishop of Canterbury
 François Leclerc du Tremblay of France (1577–1638), friar and agent and adviser of Cardinal Richelieu.
 Marc Lescarbot of France (1570–1641), author and lawyer
 Alexander Leslie, 1st Earl of Leven of Scotland (1582–1661), nobleman and general in the service of Sweden
 Christopher Levett of England (1586–1630), explorer and naval captain
 Johann Liss (1590?-1629), German painter
 Jerónimo Lobo of Portugal (1593–1678), Jesuit missionary
 Lobsang Gyatso of Tibet (1617–1682), Dalai Lama and future ruler of Tibet, r. 1618–1682 (as Dalai Lama), 1642–1682 (as ruler of Tibet)
 Adam Loftus, 1st Viscount Loftus of Ireland (1568–1643), Lord Chancellor of Ireland, in office 1619-1639
 Christen Sørensen Longomontanus of Denmark (1562–1647), astronomer
 Hendrick Lucifer (1583–1627), Dutch Buccaneer
 Charles de Luynes of France (1578–1621), Constable of France and first Duke of Luynes
 Randal MacDonnell, 1st Earl of Antrim of Ireland (?-1636), nobleman and Scots-Irish politician
 Sir Henry Mainwaring of England (1587?–1653), pirate and English naval officer
 François de Malherbe of France (1555–1628), poet and literary critic
 Man Gui of China (?–1629), general and main commander of the Chinese army following the death of Yuan Chonghuan
 George Manners, 7th Earl of Rutland of England (1580–1641), Member of Parliament and nobleman
 Ernst von Mansfeld (1580–1626), German soldier
 Mao Wenlong of China (1579–1629), military commander
 Juan de Mariana of Spain (1536–1624), Catholic priest, historian, and Monarchomach political theorist
 Maria Anna of Spain (1606–1646), Infanta and future Empress consort of the Holy Roman Empire
 Marie de' Medici (1575–1642), Queen dowager of France and former regent with her son Louis XIII
 Michel de Marillac of France (1563–1632), Minister of Justice under Louis XIII
 Giambattista Marino of Naples (1569–1625), poet
 Gervase Markham of England (1568–1637), poet and writer
 Tristano Martinelli of Mantua (1555–1630), actor
 Enrico Martínez of Spain (?–1632), hydraulic engineer
 John Mason of England (1586–1635), sailor, explorer, cartographer, colonizer, and founder of New Hampshire
 Isaac Massa of the Netherlands (1586–1643), merchant, traveller, and diplomat
 Massasoit (1580?–1661), Chief of the Wampanoag
 Philip Massinger of England (1583–1640), playwright
 Tobie Matthew of England (1577–1655), Member of Parliament
 Maximilian I of Bavaria (1573–1651), Prince-Elector of Bavaria
 Cornelis Jacobszoon May of the Netherlands, explorer and first Director-general of New Netherland
 Cardinal Mazarin of Sicily (1602–1661), Cardinal, diplomat, and future Prime Minister of France
 Domenico Mazzocchi (1592–1665), Italian composer
 Afonso Mendes, Prelate of Ethiopia and Catholic Patriarch of Ethiopia, held position (as Catholic Patriarch) 1622–1632
 Diego Carrillo de Mendoza, 1st Marquis of Gelves of Spain (1570?-1631), nobleman and Viceroy of New Spain, in office 1621–1624
 Adriaan Metius of the Netherlands (1571–1635), mathematician and astronomer
 Thomas Middleton of England (1580–1627), playwright and poet
 Daniël Mijtens of the Netherlands (1590–1648), painter
 Peter Minuit of the Netherlands (1589–1638), Director-General of New Netherland, in office 1626–1632
 Francis Mitchell of England, Knight and Extortionist
 Miyamoto Musashi of Japan (1584?–1645), prominent samurai
 Francesco Molin of Venice (1575–1655), Naval commander and future Doge of Venice
 Giles Mompesson of England (1584–1663), corrupt politician
 Edward Montagu, 2nd Earl of Manchester of England (1602–1671), Royalist Member of parliament and future Royalist commander during the English Civil War
 Richard Montagu of England (1577–1641), controversial Cleric and prelate
 Antoine de Montchrestien of France (1575–1621), soldier, dramatist, poet, and economist
 Claudio Monteverdi (1567–1643), Italian composer
 Mumtaz Mahal of India (1593–1631), Empress Consort of India (Wife of Shah Jahan)
 Jens Munk of Norway (1579–1628), navigator, explorer, and naval captain
 Bartolomé Esteban Murillo of Spain (1617–1682), painter
 Hugh Myddelton of Wales (1560–1631), entrepreneur, engineer, Baronet, and Member of Parliament
 Thomas Myddelton the Younger of Wales (1586–1666), Member of Parliament and future Parliamentary officer during the English Civil War
 Nemattanew (?–1622), Powhatan military commander and architect of the Jamestown Massacre
 Nguyễn Phúc Nguyên of Vietnam (1563–1635), Nguyễn Lord (subnational ruler of southern Vietnam), held position 1613–1635
 Nheçu, Chief of the Guaraní
 Nur Jahan of Persia (1577–1645), Empress Consort of India (Wife of Jahangir and Stepmother of Shah Jahan)
 John Nutt of England, pirate
 Pieter Nuyts of the Netherlands (1598–1655), Governor of the Dutch colony on Formosa (modern-day Taiwan) and ambassador to Japan, held position (as governor) 1627–1629
 Oldman of the Misquito Coast (?-1687), first King of the Miskito Kingdom (a British Protectorate on the eastern coasts of modern-day Nicaragua and Honduras), r. 1625–1687
 Opchanacanough (1554?-1644), Chief of the Powhatan Confederacy, held position 1618–1644
 Martin Opitz of Silesia (1597–1639), poet
 William Oughtred of England (1575–1660), mathematician
 Owaneco (?–1626), Chief of the Mohegans
 John Owen of Wales (1564–1622), Epigrammatist
 Axel Oxenstierna of Sweden (1583–1654), Lord High Chancellor of Sweden
 Rodrigo Pacheco, 3rd Marquis of Cerralvo of Spain (1565?-1652), nobleman, Inquisitor, and Viceroy of New Spain, in office 1624–1635 (as Viceroy)
 Pedro Páez of Portugal (1564–1622), Jesuit missionary who converted Malak Sagad III
 Cardinal Pamphili of Rome (1574–1655), Cardinal, Nuncio, and future Pope
 Gottfried Heinrich Graf zu Pappenheim (1594–1632), German field marshal
 Hortensio Félix Paravicino of Spain (1580–1633), Court Preacher and poet
 Richard Parry of Wales (1560–1623), Bishop of St Asaph and translator of the Bible into Welsh Language
 Vincent de Paul of France (1581–1660), Catholic Priest
 Pecksuot (?–1624), Massachusett Chief
 Nicolas-Claude Fabri de Peiresc of France (1580–1637), astronomer and antiquarian
 Algernon Percy, 10th Earl of Northumberland of England (1602–1668), Member of Parliament and future soldier during the English Civil War
 George Percy of England (1580–1632?), explorer, author, soldier, and former governor of Virginia
 Richard Perkins of England (1585?-1650), actor
 Peter Philips of England (1560–1628), composer
 Michael Praetorius (1571–1621), German composer and organist
 Samuel Purchas of England (1575?–1626), travel writer
 John Pym of England (1584–1643), Member of Parliament and future Roundhead supporter during the English Civil War
 Francisco de Quevedo of Spain (1580–1645), nobleman, politician, and writer
 Albrycht Stanisław Radziwiłł of Lithuania (1595–1656), Grand Chancellor of Lithuania (part of the Polish-Lithuanian Commonwealth), in office 1623–1656
 Rembrandt of the Netherlands (1606–1669), painter and etcher
 Kiliaen van Rensselaer of the Netherlands (1596?–1642), merchant, member of the Dutch West India Company, and Patroon of the Manor of Rensselaerswyck
 Sir Thomas Roe of England (c.1581–1644), diplomat
 Henri de Rohan of France (1579–1638), nobleman, soldier, writer, and leader of the Huguenots.
 William Rowley of England (1585?-1626), playwright
 Peter Paul Rubens of Flanders (1577–1640), painter
 Johannes Rudbeckius of Sweden (1581–1646), Lutheran bishop
 Mulla Sadra of Persia (1571–1636), philosopher and Shiite Islamic theologian
 Samoset (1590?–1655), Mohegan Sagamore and first Native American to encounter with the Settlers of the Plymouth Colony.
 Sir Edwin Sandys (1561–1629), Colonial organizer of Virginia
 George Sandys (1577–1644), English traveller, colonist, and poet
 Lew Sapieha of Lithuania (1557–1633), Grand Chancellor of Lithuania (part of the Polish-Lithuanian Commonwealth), in office 1589–1623
 Johann Hermann Schein (1586–1630), German composer
 Christoph Scheiner (1573?-1650), German Jesuit priest, physicist and astronomer
 Wilhelm Schickard (1592–1635), German inventor and mathematician
 Julius Schiller of Bavaria (1580–1627), astronomer
 Heinrich Schütz of Köstritz (1585–1672), composer and organist
 Adam von Schwarzenberg (1583–1641), nobleman and Chancellor of Brandenburg-Prussia
 Alexander Seaton of Scotland (?–1649?), Mercenary in the Service of Denmark
 Pierre Séguier of France (1588–1672), president and mortier in the parlement of Paris and future chancellor of France
 Alvaro Semedo of Portugal (1585?-1658), Jesuit missionary in China
 Juan Pérez de la Serna (1573–1631), Archbishop of Mexico, held position 1613–1627
 Alexander Seton, 1st Earl of Dunfermline of Scotland (1555–1622), lawyer, judge, and Lord Chancellor of Scotland
 Shahaji of Bijapur (1594–1664), Bijapurtan army chieftain
 Shahryar of India (1605–1638), Mughal Prince and Nur Jahan's (his stepmother) candidate to the throne of India
 Shimazu Tadatsune (1576–1638), Daimyō of Satsuma
 Robert Shirley of England (1581–1628), traveller, adventurer, and diplomat
 García de Silva Figueroa of Spain (1550–1624), Spanish ambassador to Persia
 John Smith (1580?–1631), English soldier, adventurer, and leader of the colonists of Jamestown in the Virginia Colony.
 Willebrord Snellius of the Netherlands (1580–1626), astronomer and mathematician
 Jakub Sobieski of Poland (1590–1646), nobleman, parliamentarian, and military leader
 Luis Sotelo of Spain (1574–1624), Franciscan friar and martyr
 Henri de Sourdis of France (1593–1645), Archbishop of Bordeaux and military commander
 John Speed of England (1552–1627), historian and cartographer
 Ambrogio Spinola of Genoa (1569–1630), general in the service of Spain
 John Spottiswoode of Scotland (1565–1639), Archbishop of St. Andrews, historian, and future Lord Chancellor of Scotland
 Squanto (1585?–1622),  assist to and interpreter for the Pilgrims of the Plymouth colony who helped them stamp out the treaty between them and the Wampanoag.
 Myles Standish (1584–1656), English military advisor at the Plymouth Colony
 James Stanley, 7th Earl of Derby of England (1607–1651), nobleman and future Royalist commander during the English Civil War
 Oliver St John, 5th Baron St John of Bletso (1603–1642), English politician and future Parliamentarian Army officer
 Nicholas Stone of England (1587–1647), sculptor and architect
 Sir John Suckling of England (1569–1627), Member of Parliament
 Sun Chengzong of China, Grand Secretary and Commander-in-chief of Chinese Forces
 Joachim Swartenhondt of the Netherlands (c.1566–1627), admiral
 Tamblot of the Philippines ( 1621–1622), indigenous Boholano babaylan (priest) and inciter of a religiously-motivated uprising in Bohol
 Alessandro Tassoni of Modena (1565–1635), poet and writer
 Hendrick ter Brugghen of the Netherlands (1588–1629), painter
 François Thijssen of the Netherlands (?–1638), explorer
 Thomas Tomkins of Wales (1572–1656), Cornish-Welsh composer
 Henri de la Tour d'Auvergne, Vicomte de Turenne of France (1611–1675), soldier and future Marshal of France
 Sir John Trevor Jr. of Wales (1596–1673), Puritan Member of Parliament and future member of the Council of State during the Commonwealth of England
 Sir Richard Trevor of Wales (1558–1638), landowner, soldier and politician.
 Sir Sackville Trevor of Wales (1565–1633), Sea Captain and Member of Parliament
 Thomas Trevor of England (1586–1656), Anglo-Welsh lawyer, Member of Parliament, and judge
 Nicolas Trigault of France (1577–1628), Jesuit missionary in China
 Trịnh Tùng of Vietnam (1549–1623), Trinh Lord (subnational ruler of Northern Vietnam), held position 1570–1623
 Trịnh Tráng of Vietnam (1571–1654), Trinh Lord (subnational ruler of Northern Vietnam), held position 1623–1654
 Johann Tserclaes, Count of Tilly (1559–1632), German nobleman and co-Supreme commander of the forces of the Holy Roman Empire
 Uncas (c.1588–1683), Chief of the Mohegans, held position 1626–1683
 Honoré d'Urfé of France (1568–1625), writer
 James Ussher of Ireland (1581–1656), Anglican theologian, Archbishop of Armagh, and Primate of All Ireland
 Bernard de Nogaret de La Valette d'Épernon of France (1592–1661), nobleman and military commander
 Jean Louis de Nogaret de La Valette of France (1554–1642), nobleman
 Pietro Della Valle of Rome (1586–1652), traveller
 Anthony van Dyck of Flanders (1599–1641), painter
 Władysław Vasa of Poland (1595–1648), Polish Prince, self-proclaimed Grand Duke of Moscow, and future King of the Polish-Lithuanian Commonwealth
 Sir Henry Vaughan the Elder of Derwydd, Wales (1587?–1659?), Royalist Member of Parliament
 William Vaughan of Wales (1575–1641), colonial investor and writer
 Salomo de Veenboer of the Netherlands (?–1620), Barbary pirate
 Lope de Vega of Spain (1562–1635), playwright and poet
 Diego Velázquez of Spain (1599–1660), painter
 Horace Vere, 1st Baron Vere of Tilbury of England (1565–1635), military leader
 Cornelius Vermuyden of the Netherlands (1590–1677), engineer
 George Villiers, 1st Duke of Buckingham of England (1592–1628), nobleman, statesman, and military commander
 Mutio Vitelleschi of Rome (1563–1645), Superior General of the Society of Jesus, held post 1615-1645
 Joost van den Vondel of the Netherlands (1587–1679), writer and playwright
 Luke Wadding of Ireland (1588–1657), Franciscan friar, historian, and founder of the Pontifical Irish College
 Albrecht von Wallenstein of Bohemia (1583–1634), co-Supreme commander of the forces of the Holy Roman Empire
 Edmund Waller of England (1606–1687), Member of Parliament and poet
 Sir James Ware of Ireland (1594–1666), historian and politician
 John Webster of England (1580–1634), playwright
 Wei Zhongxian of China (1568–1627), Eunuch
 Thomas Wentworth Sr., 1st Earl of Strafford of England (1593–1641), statesman (specifically Member of Parliament and future Lord deputy and lieutenant of Ireland)
 John White of England (1575–1648), Anglican priest and colonial organizer of the Massachusetts Bay Colony (not to be confused with John White the governor of the Roanoke Colony)
 Wilhelm (1598–1662), Duke of Saxe-Weimar, r. 1620–1662
 John Williams of England (1582–1650), Lord Chancellor and future Archbishop of York
 John Winthrop (1588–1649), Founder and future Governor of the Massachusetts Bay Colony (governor-elect in 1629)
 Sir Henry Wotton of England (1568–1639), author and diplomat
 Henry Wriothesley, 3rd Earl of Southampton of England (1573–1624), nobleman, patron of the theater, and colonial investor
 Sir Richard Wynn of Wales (1588–1649), Baronet, courtier, and Member of Parliament
 Xu Guangqi of China (1562–1633), Ming Dynasty bureaucrat, agricultural scientist, astronomer, and mathematician
 Yamada Nagamasa of Japan (1590–1630), adventurer, pirate, and military commander
 George Yeardley (1587–1627), Plantation owner and Governor of the Virginia Colony, held office in 1616–1617, 1619–1621, 1626–1627
 Sir Henry Yelverton of England (1566–1629), Attorney General for England and Wales, in office 1617-1621
 Yi Gwal of Korea (1587–1624), general
 Yuan Chonghuan of China (1584–1630), military commander
 Jakub Zadzik of Poland (1582–1642), Grand Chancellor of Poland
 Krzysztof Zbaraski of Poland (1580–1627), nobleman and Polish-Lithuanian ambassador to the Ottoman Empire
 Stanisław Żółkiewski of Poland (1547–1620), nobleman, military commander, and Grand Chancellor of Poland
 Zu Dashou of China (?–1656), general

In fiction
 The voyage of the Pilgrims, their first years of inhabitance in the New World, and the first Thanksgiving are often the subject of Thanksgiving themed specials and short films. One of the most notable examples is the episode "The Mayflower voyagers" of the 1988 mini-series This Is America, Charlie Brown, which ABC has often aired on Thanksgiving Day (except in 2006 and 2007) along with A Charlie Brown Thanksgiving. However, Thanksgiving would not become established as a national holiday until 1863 when President Abraham Lincoln proclaimed that it would be celebrated on the final Thursday in November. However, it did not become a federal holiday until 1941 by an act of legislation by the U.S. Congress.
 The voyage and struggles of the Pilgrims have also been the subject of some pieces of literature including Of Plymouth Plantation by William Bradford, who himself was an important figure of the 1620s, and Felicia Hemans' classic poem, "The Landing of the Pilgrim Fathers."
 The classic novel The Three Musketeers by Alexandre Dumas, père takes place in 1628. The story includes fictionalized versions of actual historical events of this year, such as the siege of La Rochelle and the assassination of the Duke of Buckingham.
 The Angel's Command, a children's adventure novel by British writer Brian Jacques, is set in the year 1628.
 The 1632 series, though set during the succeeding decade, features many characters, such as Louis XIII and Prime Minister Cardinal Richelieu of France, Gustavus II of Sweden, and Holy Roman Emperor Ferdinand II, who were active during the 1620s and uses events from the 1620s and early 1630s as a backdrop, most notably the Thirty Years' War.
 The Doctor Who audio drama The Church and the Crown takes place during the year 1626.

References